John P. Jaeckel (April 22, 1865 – June 16, 1941) was an American politician.

Biography
Jaeckel was born on April 22, 1865 to German parents in Syracuse, New York. The family then moved to Auburn, New York. He worked as a money order clerk at the Auburn post office, and later as a clerk and bookkeeper for a coal dealer.

As a Republican, he was Auburn City Treasurer from 1895 to 1898. He was New York State Treasurer from 1899 to 1902, elected in 1898 and 1900.

On October 29, 1901, he was the foreman of the witnesses to the execution of Leon Czolgosz at Auburn State Prison.

He was president of the New York State Prison Commission, and a member of the New York State Board of Parole which in 1904 denied number racketeer Albert J. Adams's application for parole.

In 1920, he was chosen the first Auburn City Manager. He died on June 16, 1941 in Auburn, New York.

References

External links
 The Republican nominees, in NYT on September 28, 1898
 His report to the State Commission of Prisons, in NYT on January 19, 1905
 Prospective candidates for Congress, in NYT on June 11, 1922

1865 births
1941 deaths
New York State Treasurers
Politicians from Auburn, New York
Politicians from Syracuse, New York